Hart Square Village is a collection of 103 log cabins and buildings which have been preserved on  in Vale, North Carolina by Dr. Robert Hart III. This collection of historical structures is the largest in the United States with build dates ranging from 1760 to 1890. Buildings include barns, a tavern, a chapel, a schoolhouse and many others creating a unique village nestled around the lakes on the property. The majority of the buildings are from a 22 mile radius of the location, with the first cabin arriving in 1973. Hart Square hosts events and classes throughout the year which showcase and teach colonial and pioneer era life.

Events 
The Hart Square Festival is held on the fourth Saturday in October each year. The event offers guests the chance to interact with artisans in the period's attire, and learn and experience the daily joys and struggles of pioneer life.

References 

Buildings and structures in North Carolina
Lincoln County, North Carolina